Saprus is a genus of beetles belonging to the family Aegialiidae.

The species of this genus are found in Australia.

Species:

Saprus griffithi 
Saprus lawrencei 
Saprus victoriae 
Saprus weiri

References

Beetles